Chirculeşti may refer to several villages in Romania:

 Chirculeşti, a village in Iepurești Commune, Giurgiu County
 Chirculeşti, a village in Bălceşti Commune, Vâlcea County